Michele Weaver is an American actress, known for playing the leading role in the Oprah Winfrey Network romantic drama series, Love Is.

Life and career
Weaver was born and raised in Littleton, Colorado. She is the daughter of a Haitian mother and her father from Colorado. Weaver attended Pepperdine University and later began performing in theatre. On screen, she began appearing in small films, and played secondary roles on television shows include Switched at Birth and Cooper Barrett's Guide to Surviving Life. She played bigger roles in the Syfy television film 2 Lava 2 Lantula (2016), and was co-lead in the thriller Illicit (2017) opposite David Ramsey and Vivica A. Fox.

In 2018, Weaver was cast in a leading role on the Oprah Winfrey Network romantic drama series, Love Is created by Mara Brock Akil and Salim Akil. The series is based on the Akils’ relationship, the series told the story of a power couple navigating the landscape of Black Hollywood. On July 31, 2018, it was originally renewed for a second season, but on December 19, 2018, OWN reversed the decision and canceled the series after Salim Akil was accused of domestic violence and copyright infringement.

In 2019, Weaver appeared opposite Delta Burke, Tim Reid, Brooke Elliott in an episode of Netflix anthology series Dolly Parton's Heartstrings. In 2020, she starred in the short-lived NBC drama series, Council of Dads.

Filmography

Film

Television

References

External links

American television actresses
Living people
People from Littleton, Colorado
21st-century American actresses
Pepperdine University alumni
Year of birth missing (living people)
Actresses from Colorado
American film actresses
African-American actresses
American people of Haitian descent
21st-century African-American women
21st-century African-American people